Henry Vivian Nelles (born 1942) is a Canadian historian and professor emeritus at York University. In 1981, he was the Visiting King Professor at Harvard University.
He co-authored The Revenge of the Methodist Bicycle Company.

References

1942 births
20th-century Canadian historians
Living people
Academic staff of York University